Vitaliy Oleksiyovych Hodziatsky (Ukrainian: Годзяцький Віталій Олексійович, born 26 December 1936) is a Ukrainian composer and teacher. He was made a Merited Artist of Ukraine  in 1996.

He was born in Kyiv and studied at Kyiv Conservatory with Borys Lyatoshynsky, graduating in 1961. He has composed music for piano, orchestra, voice, and solo woodwind and string instruments.

External links
Biography

1936 births
Living people
Ukrainian classical composers